Barack is a type of Hungarian brandy (Pálinka) made of (or flavored with) apricots; an apricot brandy. 

The word barack is a collective term for both apricot (in Hungarian sárgabarack, lit. "yellow-peach") and peach (in Hungarian őszibarack, lit. "autumn-peach"). Note that the Hungarian word barack is etymologically related to the English word 'peach' as well as many words meaning the same in many European languages, and ultimately goes back to persikos, the ancient Greek word for 'Persian'.

See also
 

Brandies
Apricots